Annie Zaleski is an American music journalist and author.

Career
Zaleski is a regular writer for mainstream media outlets such as The A.V. Club and NPR Music, and a columnist at Salon. She is based in Cleveland, Ohio where she has won first place awards from the Ohio Society of Professional Journalists, including Best Arts Review (2017) and Best Feature Writing (2019).

Zaleski was previously an editor and music writer at the Riverfront Times in St. Louis, where she also hosted a radio show on KDHX called International Pop Overthrow. She moved to Cleveland Ohio to become managing editor at Alternative Press in 2011. She wrote the liner notes to the 2016 reissue of R.E.M.'s Out of Time.

Books
Zaleski wrote a book in the 33⅓ series about the Duran Duran album Rio which was published in May 2021. She is working on the book Why the B-52s Matter for University of Texas Press.

Personal life
Zaleski grew up with her parents and brother near Cleveland, Ohio. She attended Rocky River High School and then Harvard University from 1998 to 2002 where she wrote for the Harvard Crimson and was a DJ on the college's radio station. She graduated from Harvard with a bachelor's degree in English. She collects records and is on the board of directors for Lake Erie Ink.

Zaleski married Matt Wardlaw, who is also a music journalist, in July 2013.

References

External links
 Personal website

Living people
American music journalists
Harvard College alumni
Journalists from Ohio
Rocky River High School (Ohio) alumni
Date of birth missing (living people)
Year of birth missing (living people)
The Harvard Crimson people